Asli may refer to:
Orang Asli, the indigenous people in Malaysia
Aslı, a Turkish feminine given name
Asli (surname)
Asli Demirguc-Kunt (born 1961), Turkish economist
Asli Hassan Abade, Somali pilot